Anne Peters (born November 15, 1964 in Berlin) is a German-Swiss jurist with a focus on public international law. She is director at the Max Planck Institute for Comparative Public Law and International Law, honorary professor at the University of Basel, University of Heidelberg and Free University of Berlin, and at William W. Cook Global Law Professor at Michigan Law School.

Her research interests include constitutionalization and the history of international law, global animal rights, global governance and the status of humans  in international law. Since 2019 Anne Peters is chairwoman of the German Society for International Law (DGIR).

Life and Work
Anne Peters studied Law, Modern Greek and Spanish at the Julius-Maximilians-Universität Würzburg, at the University of Lausanne, at Albert-Ludwigs-Universität Freiburg and at Harvard Law School. Peters earned her doctorate in 1994 at the Albert-Ludwigs-Universität Freiburg on the basis of her Dissertation-Thesis “Das Gebietsreferendum im Völkerrecht: seine Bedeutung im Licht der Staatenpraxis” (The regional referendum in international law: its significance in the light of state practice). From 1995 to 2001 she worked as a research assistant at the Walther Schücking Institute for International Law of the Christian-Albrechts-University in Kiel. She obtained the Habilitation-qualification at the Walther-Schücking-Institute of Public International Law at the Christian Albrechts University Kiel on the basis of her Habilitation-Thesis “Elemente einer Theorie der Verfassung Europas” (Elements of a Theory of the Constitution of Europe) in 2000.

From 2001 to 2013, Peters was Full Professor of International and Constitutional Law at the University of Basel. From 2004 to 2005 she was dean, from 2008 to 2012 research dean of the Law Faculty of Basel and from 2008 to 2013 member of the research council at the Swiss National Science Foundation. Since 2013 she is director at the Max Planck Institute for Comparative Public Law and International Law in Heidelberg. Also since 2013, Peters is Professor (Titularprofessor) of Public Law, International Law, European Law and Comparative Law at the University of Basel, Corresponding Member of the Austrian Academy of Sciences and since 2014 Honorary Professor at the Ruprecht-Karls-Universität Heidelberg.

She has been a visiting professor at Sciences Po (2009), Paris Panthéon-Assas University, Institut des hautes études internationales (2014), Beijing University, Institute of International Law (2014 and 2016) and the Université Panthéon-Sorbonne (2015). She was a Fellow at the Wissenschaftskolleg zu Berlin in 2012/2013.

Peters was president of the European Society of International Law from 2010-2012, as well as board member of the German Association of Constitutional Law (VDStRL) from 2014-2015. She was a member (substitute) of the Venice Commission (European Commission for Democracy through Law) for Germany (2011-2015) and legal expert of the Independent Fact Finding Mission on the conflict in Georgia (2009). She has been a member of the Board of Directors of the German Society for International Law (DGIR) (2017-2019), of the General Council of the International Society of Public Law (I-CON-S) since 2014 and Vice-President of the Foundation Board of the Basel Institute on Governance (BIG) since 2002.

She has been a member of the Council of International Law of the Federal Foreign Office since 2013 as well as of the Research Advisory Board of the Stiftung Wissenschaft und Politik – German Institute for International and Security Affairs. Since 2021, she is general editor of the Max Planck Encyclopedia of Public International Law.

Research focus and theses
Peters' research interests relate to public international law including its history, global animal law, global governance and global constitutionalism, and the status of humans in international law. Peters’ theses are the following:

Referendums on territory, when conducted freely, fairly, peacefully and under impartial supervision, are a necessary but not sufficient procedural factor in the exercise of peoples' right to self-determination. In this way they can contribute to the legalization of a change of territory, even in the case of the unilateral separation of a region from a state.

EU basic legal norms can and should be qualified as a constitution of the EU (irrespective of the existence of a formal constitutional document). This European constitution obtains its legitimacy mainly through probation, and thus through its "output", i.e. legal and political results in the European public interest, less by its genesis and by the "input" from European citizens through elections and votes.

The erosion of state constitutional law through increasingly intense exercise of sovereignty by International Organizations, increasing international regulations and extraterritorial effects of state action can and should be compensated by the recognition of global constitutional law, which constitutes, channels and limits this exercise of sovereignty ("compensatory constitutionalism").

International law should and can counteract its tendency towards epistemic nationalism by problematizing national prejudices and maintaining sufficient distance from legal practice; the pursuit of a constructive utopia is the task of international law.

The democratization of international law and global governance is possible and necessary to complement its indirect democratic legitimacy (via national parliaments and governments) ("dual democracy").

The well-being of people, their security and their rights are the foundation and limit of state sovereignty. "Humanity", not "sovereignty" is the ultimate rationale of international law.

A general principle of transparency has emerged as the fundamental principle of international law in all its branches, beginning with environmental law. The function of transparency in international law is similar to that in national public law: transparency enables public criticism of the exercise of international sovereignty. The principle of transparency strengthens the quality of international law as public law, as the right to establish and channel sovereignty, in the public interest and under the control of the public. The transparency of international institutions and legislative and implementation procedures can thus mitigate the democratic deficit of international law, ie the lack of a world parliament, a democratic legislative process, and a direct right of citizens to participate in the appointment of international offices.

The history of international law can be rewritten using approaches of global history. The Global History Approach raises awareness of the problem of Eurocentrism in the development of international law and its presentation, and makes it easier to recognize and appreciate non-European influences.

The individual enjoys "subjective international rights" and obligations which are, so to speak, below the threshold of particularly high-quality human rights, for example in international labor law, refugee law, international humanitarian law, etc. Allowing the recognition of these legal positions and the (contingent) international legal capacity of human beings expressed therein it is to qualify the individual as an original and normative priority (not only derived from the states and subordinate) subject of international law. The shift from the state as the starting point of international law to man represents a paradigm shift in the international legal order.

Global animal rights will be established and developed as a field of research to safeguard animal welfare standards undermined by globalization, outsourcing and location mobility and to explore new concepts such as animal rights, animal status, the sovereignty of wildlife over natural resources. The new field of research can receive suggestions from numerous neighboring disciplines as part of the "animal turn" of the humanities and social sciences.

References

External links 
 

1960 births
Jurists from Berlin
Academic staff of the University of Basel
Max Planck Institute for Comparative Public Law and International Law people
Living people
Officers Crosses of the Order of Merit of the Federal Republic of Germany
Max Planck Institute directors